Anders Møller may refer to:
 Anders Møller (athlete)
 Anders Møller (wrestler)

See also
 Anders Møller Christensen, Danish footballer